Wendy Woodley (born 2 February 1968) is a Bermudian woman cricketer. She played for Bermuda at the 2008 Women's Cricket World Cup Qualifier.

References

External links 

1968 births
Living people
Bermudian women cricketers